Yermak (Russian: Ерма́к) was a 16th century Russian explorer.

Yermak or Ermak may also refer to:

Places
Aksu, Kazakhstan, a city in Kazakhstan, known as Yermak until 1993
Yermak Point in Antarctica
Yermak Stone, a cliff in Perm Krai, Russia

Other
GAZ Ermak, a Russian truck
Yermak (1898 icebreaker), a Soviet and Russian ship
Yermak (name)
Yermak Angarsk, an ice hockey team in Angarsk, Russia
Yermak Monument in Novocherkassk, Russia
Yermak-McFaul Expert Group on Russian Sanctions, a group working on sanctions against Russia and Belarus in response to the 2022 Russian invasion of Ukraine